Euthalia djata  is a butterfly of the family Nymphalidae (Limenitidinae). It is found in the Indomalayan realm.<ref>[http://ftp.funet.fi/pub/sci/bio/life/insecta/lepidoptera/ditrysia/papilionoidea/nymphalidae/limenitidinae/euthalia/ " Euthalia  " Hübner, [1819"] at Markku Savela's Lepidoptera and Some Other Life Forms</ref>

SubspeciesE. d. djata BorneoE. d. rubidifascia Talbot, 1929  Peninsular Malaya, SingaporeE. d. siamica Riley & Godfrey, 1925 Thailand, Langkawi IslandE. d. ludonia'' Staudinger, 1889 Palawan

References

Butterflies described in 1887
djata